Moss Hart (October 24, 1904 – December 20, 1961) was an American playwright, librettist, and theater director.

Early years
Hart was born in New York City, the son of Lillian (Solomon) and Barnett Hart, a cigar maker. He had a younger brother, Bernard. He grew up in relative poverty with his English-born Jewish immigrant parents in the Bronx and in Sea Gate, Brooklyn. He was the great-grandson of the Jewish bare-knuckle pugilist Barney Aaron.

In his youth, he had a strong relationship with his Aunt Kate, with whom he later was to lose contact due to a falling out between her and his parents, and Kate's weakening mental state. She piqued his interest in the theater, taking him to see performances often. Hart even went so far as to create an "alternate ending" to her life in his book Act One. He writes that she died while he was working on out-of-town tryouts for The Beloved Bandit. In later life, Kate had become eccentric and then disturbed, vandalizing Hart's home, writing threatening letters and setting fires backstage during rehearsals for Jubilee, yet his relationship with her had been formative. He learned that the theater made possible "the art of being somebody else … not a scrawny boy with bad teeth, a funny name … and a mother who was a distant drudge."

Hart's first glimpse of Broadway came in 1919 when he was 14 years old. He later recounted exiting the subway at Times Square and standing agog at the urban tableau before him: "A swirling mob of shouting happy people... confetti and paper streamers... soldiers and sailors climbed happily onto the tops of taxis, grabbing girls up to dance with them. My first thought was 'Of course, that's just the way I thought it would be.'" Unbeknownst to Hart, his arrival had coincided with the signing of the armistice that ended World War One.

Career

After working several years as a director of amateur theatrical groups and an entertainment director at summer resorts, he scored his first Broadway hit with Once in a Lifetime (1930), a farce about the arrival of the sound era in Hollywood. The play was written in collaboration with Broadway veteran George S. Kaufman, who regularly wrote with others, notably Marc Connelly and Edna Ferber. (Kaufman also performed in the play's original Broadway cast in the role of a frustrated playwright hired by Hollywood) and produced by Sam Harris. Hart's agent at this time was Frieda Fishbein, who brought a lawsuit against Hart, contending she was entitled to a percentage of the royalties from plays produced by Harris. The matter was settled out of court for an undisclosed amount.

During the next decade, Kaufman and Hart teamed on a string of successes, including You Can't Take It with You (1936) and The Man Who Came to Dinner (1939). Though Kaufman had hits with others, Hart is generally conceded to be his most important collaborator.

You Can't Take It With You, the story of an eccentric family and how they live during the Depression, won the 1937 Pulitzer Prize for drama. It is Hart's most-revived play. When director Frank Capra and writer Robert Riskin adapted it for the screen in 1938, the film won the Best Picture Oscar and Capra won for Best Director.

The Man Who Came To Dinner is about the caustic Sheridan Whiteside who, after injuring himself slipping on ice, must stay in a Midwestern family's house. The character was based on Kaufman and Hart's friend, critic Alexander Woollcott. Other characters in the play are based on Noël Coward, Harpo Marx and Gertrude Lawrence.

Throughout the 1930s, Hart worked both with and without Kaufman on several musicals and revues, including Face the Music (1932); As Thousands Cheer (1933), with songs by Irving Berlin; Jubilee (musical) (1935), with songs by Cole Porter; and I'd Rather Be Right (1937), with songs by Richard Rodgers and Lorenz Hart. (Lorenz Hart and Moss Hart were not related.) 
After George Washington Slept Here (1940), Kaufman and Hart called it quits. Hart continued to write plays after parting with Kaufman, such as Christopher Blake (1946) and Light Up the Sky (1948), as well as the book for the musical Lady In The Dark (1941), with songs by Kurt Weill and Ira Gershwin. However, he became best known during this period as a director. Among the Broadway hits he staged were Junior Miss (1941), Dear Ruth (1944) and Anniversary Waltz (1954).  By far his biggest hit was the musical My Fair Lady (1956), adapted from George Bernard Shaw's Pygmalion, with book and lyrics by Alan Jay Lerner and music by Frederick Loewe. The show ran over six years and won a Tony Award for Best Musical. Hart picked up the Tony for Best Director.

Hart also wrote some screenplays, including Gentleman's Agreement (1947) – for which he received an Oscar nomination – Hans Christian Andersen (1952) and A Star Is Born (1954). He wrote a memoir, Act One: An Autobiography by Moss Hart, which was released in 1959. It was adapted to film in 1963, with George Hamilton portraying Hart. The last show Hart directed was the Lerner and Loewe musical Camelot (1960). During a troubled out-of-town tryout, Hart had a heart attack. The show opened before he fully recovered, but he and Lerner reworked it after the opening. That, along with huge pre-sales and a cast performance on The Ed Sullivan Show, helped ensure the expensive production was a hit.

Guild presidency
Hart was the tenth president of the Dramatists Guild of America, from 1947 until 1956, when Oscar Hammerstein II became his successor.

Personal life
Hart married Kitty Carlisle on August 10, 1946; they had two children.

Death

Moss Hart died of a heart attack at the age of 57 on December 20, 1961, at his winter home in Palm Springs, California. He was entombed in a crypt at Ferncliff Cemetery in Hartsdale, New York.

Legacy

In 1972, 11 years after his death, Moss Hart was inducted into the American Theater Hall of Fame, one of 23 people to be selected into the Hall of Fame's first induction class that year. Alan Jay Lerner paid tribute to Hart in his memoir, The Street Where I Live.

Moss Hart Awards
The New England Theatre Conference offers the Moss Hart Memorial Award at their annual convention to theater groups in New England that put forth imaginative productions of exemplary scripts. These awards are designed to honor Moss Hart as well as the award recipients. Past winners include Wellesley Repertory Theatre, Staples Players, and Suffield Academy.

Moss Hart and Kitty Carlisle Hart New Play Initiative

Developed as an offshoot of the very successful New Play Initiative of Burbank, California's Grove Theater Center, the Moss Hart and Kitty Carlisle Hart New Play Initiative (Hart NPI) expands the program to one of the few programs of its kind where a playwright will be guaranteed a production of his/her play in Los Angeles (Burbank), as well as an Off-Broadway Premiere at 59E59 Theaters in New York City.  The GTC New Play Initiative is the brainchild of producers Charles Johanson and Kevin Cochran (founders of Grove Theater Center) and its expansion to a truly bi-coastal program with the focus on the author and their vision for their work. The Hart NPI is under the leadership of Moss Hart's son Christopher Hart (artistic director), Kevin Cochran (producing artistic director) and Charles Johanson (executive director). In the first Hart NPI play cycle (2017-2018) there were 1,243 submissions from 44 states and 6 countries!. The Hart NPI will select 16-21 semifinalists, which will then be narrowed down to eight finalists and the eight will be narrowed down to the winners: Four Bronze Hart NPI winners will have a reading of their play at 59E59 Theaters, two Silver Hart NPI winners will have a production of their play in Los Angeles (Burbank), CA at the GTC Burbank and the Gold Hart NPI winner will have an Off-Broadway premiere at 59E59 Theaters. Dr. Catherine Hart (Moss and Kitty's daughter, who also serves on the board of trustees of the Hart NPI) said that "Having a program like this in Moss & Kitty's name would have made them proud."

Work

 Plays
 1930 Once In A Lifetime (Kaufman and Hart)
 1934 Merrily We Roll Along (Kaufman and Hart)
 1936 You Can't Take It with You (Kaufman and Hart; Pulitzer Prize winner)
 1937 I'd Rather Be Right (Kaufman and Hart)
 1938 The Fabulous Invalid (Kaufman and Hart)
 1939 The American Way (Kaufman and Hart)
 1939 The Man Who Came to Dinner (Kaufman and Hart)
 1940 George Washington Slept Here (Kaufman and Hart)
 1941 Lady in the Dark, with Kurt Weill and Ira Gershwin
 1943 Winged Victory
 1948 Light Up the Sky

 Screenplays
 1944 Winged Victory
 1947 Gentleman's Agreement
 1952 Hans Christian Andersen
 1954 A Star Is Born

 Autobiography
 1959 (1989)

References

Further reading

External links

 
 Moss Hart and Kitty Carlisle Hart Papers at the Wisconsin Center for Film and Theater Research.
 
 
 

1904 births
1961 deaths
American theatre directors
Burials at Ferncliff Cemetery
Donaldson Award winners
Pulitzer Prize for Drama winners
Tony Award winners
Jewish theatre directors
Jewish American dramatists and playwrights
Writers from Brooklyn
Writers from Palm Springs, California
American people of English-Jewish descent
20th-century American dramatists and playwrights
People with bipolar disorder
American male dramatists and playwrights
20th-century American male writers
People from Sea Gate, Brooklyn
20th-century American Jews